Thutmose II (sometimes read as Thutmosis or Tuthmosis II, Thothmes in older history works in Latinized Greek; Ancient Egyptian: /ḏḥwty.ms/ Djehutymes, meaning "Thoth is born") was the fourth Pharaoh of the Eighteenth Dynasty of Egypt. His reign is generally dated from 1493 to 1479 BC. His body was found in the Deir el-Bahri Cache above the Mortuary Temple of Hatshepsut and can be viewed today in the National Museum of Egyptian Civilization in Cairo.

Family

Thutmose II was the son of Thutmose I and a minor wife, Mutnofret. He was, therefore, a lesser son of Thutmose I and chose to marry his fully royal half-sister, Hatshepsut, in order to secure his kingship. While he successfully put down rebellions in Nubia and the Levant and defeated a group of nomadic Bedouins, these campaigns were specifically carried out by the king's Generals, and not by Thutmose II himself. This is often interpreted as evidence that Thutmose II was still a minor at his accession. Thutmose II fathered Neferure with Hatshepsut, as well as a male heir, the famous Thutmose III, by a lesser wife named Iset before his death.

Some archaeologists believe that Hatshepsut was the real power behind the throne during Thutmose II's rule because of the similar domestic and foreign policies that were later pursued under her reign and because of her claim that she was her father's intended heir. She is depicted in several raised relief scenes from a Karnak gateway dating to Thutmose II's reign both together with her husband and alone. She later had herself crowned Pharaoh several years into the rule of her husband's young successor Thutmose III; this is confirmed by the fact that "the queen's agents actually replaced the big boy king's name in a few places with her own cartouches" on the gateway.

Manetho's Epitome refers to Thutmose II as "Chebron" (a reference to his prenomen, Aakheperenre) and gives him a reign of 13 years, but this figure is highly disputed among scholars. Some Egyptologists prefer to shorten his reign by a full decade to only three years because his highest Year Date is only a Year 1 II Akhet day 8 stele.

Dates and length of reign

Manetho's Epitome has been a debated topic among Egyptologists with little consensus given the small number of surviving documents for his reign, but a 13-year reign is preferred by older scholars while newer scholars prefer a shorter 3-4 year reign for this king due to the minimal amount of scarabs and monuments attested under Thutmose II. It is still possible to estimate when Thutmose II's reign would have begun by means of a heliacal rise of Sothis in Amenhotep I's reign, which would give him a reign from 1493 to 1479 BC, although uncertainty about how to interpret the rise also permits a date from 1513 to 1499 BC, and uncertainty about how long Thutmose I ruled could also potentially place his reign several years earlier still. Nonetheless, scholars generally assign him a reign from 1493 or 1492 to 1479.

Argument for a short reign

Ineni, who was already aged by the start of Thutmose II's reign, lived through this ruler's entire reign into that of Hatshepsut. In addition, Thutmose II is poorly attested in the monumental record and in the contemporary tomb autobiographies of New Kingdom officials. A clear count of monuments from his rule, which is the principal tool for estimating a king's reign when dated documents are not available, is nearly impossible because Hatshepsut usurped most of his monuments, and Thutmose III in turn reinscribed Thutmose II's name indiscriminately over other monuments. However, apart from several surviving blocks of buildings erected by the king at Semna, Kumma, and Elephantine, Thutmose II's only major monument consists of a limestone gateway at Karnak that once lay at the front of the Fourth Pylon's forecourt. Even this monument was not completed in Thutmose II's reign but in the reign of his son Thutmose III, which hints at "the nearly ephemeral nature of Thutmose II's reign". The gateway was later dismantled and its building blocks incorporated into the foundation of the Third Pylon by Amenhotep III.

In 1987, Luc Gabolde published an important study that statistically compared the number of surviving scarabs found under Thutmose I, Thutmose II and Hatshepsut. While monuments can be usurped, scarabs are so small and comparatively insignificant that altering their names would be impractical and without profit; hence, they provide a far better insight into this period. Hatshepsut's reign is believed to have lasted for 21 years and 9 months. Gabolde highlighted, in his analysis, the consistently small number of surviving scarabs known for Thutmose II compared to Thutmose I and Hatshepsut respectively; for instance, Flinders Petrie's older study of scarab seals noted 86 seals for Thutmose I, 19 seals for Thutmose II and 149 seals for Hatshepsut while more recent studies by Jaeger estimate a total of 241 seals for Thutmose I, 463 seals for Hatshepsut and only 65 seals for Thutmose II. Hence, unless there was an abnormally low number of scarabs produced under Thutmose II, this would indicate that the king's reign was rather short-lived. On this basis, Gabolde estimated Thutmose I and II's reigns to be approximately 11 and 3 full years, respectively. Consequently, the reign length of Thutmose II has been a much debated subject among Egyptologists with little consensus given the small number of surviving documents for his reign.

Argument for a long reign

Thutmose's reign is still traditionally given as 13 or 14 years. Although Ineni's autobiography can be interpreted to say that Thutmose reigned only a short time, it also calls Thutmose II a "hawk in the nest", indicating that he was perhaps a child when he assumed the throne. Since he lived long enough to father two children—Neferure and Thutmose III—this suggests that he may have had a longer reign of 13 years in order to reach adulthood and start a family. The German Egyptologist, J. Von Beckerath, uses this line of argument to support the case of a 13-year reign for Thutmose II. Alan Gardiner noted that at one point a monument had been identified by Georges Daressy in 1900, dated to Thutmose's 18th year, although its precise location has not been identified. This inscription is now usually attributed to Hatshepsut, who certainly did have an 18th year. Von Beckerath observes that a Year 18 date appears in a fragmentary inscription of an Egyptian official and notes that the date likely refers to Hatshepsut's prenomen Maatkare, which had been altered from Aakheperenre Thutmose II, with the reference to the deceased Thutmose II being removed. There is also the curious fact that Hatshepsut celebrated her Sed Jubilee in her Year 16, which von Beckerath believes occurred 30 years after the death of Thutmose I, her father, who was the main source of her claim to power. This would create a gap of 13 to 14 years where Thutmose II's reign would fit in between Hatshepsut and Thutmose I's rule. Von Beckerath additionally stresses that Egyptologists have no conclusive criteria to statistically evaluate the reign length of Thutmose II based on the number of preserved objects from his reign.

Catherine Roerig has proposed that tomb KV20, generally believed to have been commissioned by Hatshepsut, was the original tomb of Thutmose II in the Valley of the Kings. If correct, this would be a major project on the part of Thutmose II, which required a construction period of several years and implies a long reign for this king. Secondly, new archaeological work by French Egyptologists at Karnak has produced evidence of a pylon and an opulent festival court of Thutmose II in front of the 4th pylon according to Luc Gabolde. Meanwhile, French Egyptologists at Karnak have also uncovered blocks from a chapel and a barque sanctuary constructed by Thutmose II there. Finally, Zygmunt Wysocki has proposed that the funerary temple of Hatshepsut at Deir el-Bahari was originally begun as Thutmose II's own mortuary temple. Thutmose III here later replaced depictions of Hatshepsut with those by Thutmose II in those parts of the temple that are proposed to have been executed by the latter king before Hatshepsut took over the temple following Thutmose II's death. Thutmose II also contributed to the decoration of the temple of Khnum at Semna.

A reconsideration of this new archaeological evidence would remove several arguments usually advanced in support of a short reign: namely the absence of a tomb that can be assigned to Thutmose II, the absence of a funerary temple and the lack of any major works undertaken by this pharaoh. Thutmose II's Karnak building projects would also imply that his reign was closer to 13 years rather than just 3 years.

Archaeologists from Warsaw University’s Institute of Archaeology led by Andrzej Niwiński have discovered a treasure chest and a wooden box dated 3,500 years back in the Egyptian site of Deir el-Bahari in March 2020.

The stone chest consisted of several items and all of them covered with linen canvas. Three bundles of flax were found during the excavation. A goose skeleton was found inside one of them, sacrificed for religious purposes. The second one included goose eggs. It is believed that what the third bundle contained was an ibis egg which had a symbolic meaning for the ancient Egyptians. In addition, a little wooden trinket box was discovered inside the bundle, believed to contain the name Pharaoh Thutmose II.

According to the Andrzej Niwiński, "The chest itself is about 40 cm long, with a slight smaller height. It was perfectly camouflaged, looked like an ordinary stone block. Only after a closer look did it turn out to be a chest."

Campaigns
Upon Thutmose's coronation, Kush rebelled, as it had the habit of doing upon the transition of Egyptian kingship. The Nubian state had been completely subjugated by Thutmose I, but some rebels from Khenthennofer rose up, and the Egyptian forces retreated into a fortress built by Thutmose I. On account of his relative youth at the time, Thutmose II dispatched an army into Nubia rather than leading it himself, but he seems to have easily crushed this revolt with the aid of his father's military generals. An account of the campaign is given by the historian Josephus who refers to it as the Ethiopic War.

Thutmose also seems to have fought against the Shasu Bedouin in the Sinai, in a campaign mentioned by Ahmose Pen-Nekhbet. Although this campaign has been called a minor raid, there is a fragment recorded by Kurt Sethe that records a campaign in Upper Retenu, or Syria, which appears to have reached as far as a place called Niy where Thutmose I hunted elephants after returning from crossing the Euphrates. This quite possibly indicates that the raid against the Shasu was only fought en route to Syria.

Mummy

Thutmose II's mummy was discovered in the Deir el-Bahri cache, revealed in 1881. He was interred along with other 18th and 19th dynasty leaders including Ahmose I, Amenhotep I, Thutmose I, Thutmose III, Ramesses I, Seti I, Ramesses II, and Ramesses IX. It included a label that indicated it had been re-wrapped in the Twenty-first Dynasty.

The mummy was unwrapped by Gaston Maspero on July 1, 1886. There is a strong familial resemblance to the mummy of Thutmose I, his likely father, as the mummy's face and shape of the head are very similar. The body of Thutmose II suffered greatly at the hands of ancient tomb robbers, with his left arm broken off at the shoulder-joint, the forearm separated at the elbow joint, and his right arm chopped off below the elbow. His anterior abdominal wall and much of his chest had been hacked at, possibly by an axe. In addition, his right leg had been severed from his body. All of these injuries were sustained post-mortem, though the body also showed signs that Thutmose II did not have an easy life, as the following quote by Gaston Maspero attests:

James Harris and Fawzia Hussien (1991) conducted an X-ray survey on New Kingdom royal mummies and examined the mummified remains of Thutmose II. The results of the study determined that the mummy of Thutmose II had a craniofacial trait measurement that is common among Nubian populations.

His mummy has the inventory number CG 61066. In April 2021 his mummy was moved from the Museum of Egyptian Antiquities to National Museum of Egyptian Civilization along with those of 17 other kings and 4 queens in an event termed the Pharaohs' Golden Parade. The identity of the mummy has been questioned. The re-wrapping label appears to identify him as Thutmose II but it may have been modified from Thutmose I.

As the Pharaoh of the Exodus
Thutmose II is one of the more popular candidates for the Biblical story of the Pharaoh of the Exodus. Alfred Edersheim proposes in his Old Testament Bible History that Thutmose II is best qualified to be the pharaoh of Exodus based on the fact that he had a brief, prosperous reign and then a sudden collapse with no son (except for Thutmose III) to succeed him. His widow Hatshepsut then became first Regent (for Thutmose III) then Pharaoh in her own right. Edersheim states that Thutmose II is the only Pharaoh's mummy to display cysts, possible evidence of plagues that spread through the Egyptian and Hittite Empires at that time. Additionally, when the chronologies given in the Bible are  understood at face value, the Exodus would have occurred in 1497 BC, roughly corresponding to the generally-accepted dates of Thutmose's reign.

See also
 History of Ancient Egypt
 Family tree of the Eighteenth dynasty of Egypt

References

External links

 
1479 BC deaths
15th-century BC Pharaohs
Pharaohs of the Eighteenth Dynasty of Egypt
Ancient Egyptian mummies
Ancient child monarchs
Year of birth unknown
Egyptian Museum
Hatshepsut
Children of Thutmose I